The Lake Amistad Dam International Crossing is a dam that serves as an international bridge which crosses the Rio Grande south of Lake Amistad. The dam connects the United States-Mexico border cities of Del Rio, Texas and Ciudad Acuña, Coahuila. The dam is also known as "Amistad Dam" and "Presa la Amistad".

Description
The Lake Amistad Dam International Crossing is owned by the United States Government and the Mexican Government. The dam has a two-lane roadway and is 6 miles long. The border facilities were completed in 1969. Amistad Reservoir is also referred to as Lake Amistad.

References

Dams in Mexico
Dams in Texas
International bridges in Texas
International bridges in Coahuila
Buildings and structures in Val Verde County, Texas
Transportation in Val Verde County, Texas
Road bridges in Texas
Del Rio, Texas